Sophie Vouzelaud (born June 21, 1987) is a French model and beauty pageant contestant who was elected first runner-up in the 2007 Miss France pageant. She represented the region of Limousin.

Vouzelaud was born in Saint-Junien, Haute-Vienne. She was born deaf. She is the first deaf or hard of hearing person to participate in the finals of a Miss France pageant. She communicates with French sign language (LSF) but was adamant in speaking at the finals. She is currently pursuing a Bachelor's degree in accounting.

According to Geneviève de Fontenay, Vouzelaud had a comfortable lead in the French public's votes.  Ultimately however, the jury's vote—comprising two-thirds of the final score—elected finalist, Rachel Legrain-Trapani as Miss France 2007 who thus won by a single vote of the jury.

Vouzelaud requested—backed by the elected Miss France 2007 Rachel Legrain-Trapani—to represent France at the Miss World pageant to increase awareness and exposure of deaf people. The organizers refused, stating that they only accept the official winner of the country as a competitor.

Vouzelaud then went on to compete in Miss International 2007 on October 15 of that year in Japan against another deaf person, Vanessa Peretti from Venezuela. Peretti qualified for the Top 15, but Vouzelaud did not.

Danse avec les stars

In 2015, she participated in the sixth season of Danse avec les stars – the French version of Dancing with the Stars. She was partnered with professional dancer Maxime Dereymez. On November 21, 2015, they were eliminated finishing 8th out of 10 contestants.

Filmography

References 
  Article in French in a reputable newspaper about the 2007 Miss France pageant
  Miss France laisse sa place au concours Miss Monde 2007
  Official website of Sophie Vouzelaud

1987 births
Living people
People from Haute-Vienne
French people with disabilities
Deaf beauty pageant contestants
Miss International 2007 delegates
French beauty pageant winners
French deaf people